The International Professional Rodeo Association (IPRA) is the second-largest American rodeo organization in the world. It sanctions rodeos in the United States and Canada, with members from said countries, as well as others. Its championship event is the International Finals Rodeo (IFR), held every January. The IPRA is headquartered in Oklahoma City, Oklahoma.

History
The association was formed in 1957 as the Interstate Rodeo Association. At the end of that same year, it named its first world champions. However, world champions would not be crowned again until 1960.

In 1961, it became the first rodeo organization to recognize cowgirls’ barrel racing as a world championship event in a predominantly male rodeo. 

In 1964, the Interstate Rodeo Association changed its name to the International Rodeo Association. That same year, it set its headquarters in Pauls Valley, Oklahoma and created a Board of Governors, which consisted of performers, producers, fans, contestants, and contractors. 

In February 1971, the association debuted the International Finals Rodeo (IFR) to determine the world champions in each rodeo event. It was the finals event for the 1970 season, and was held at the Tulsa Assembly Center in Tulsa, Oklahoma, where it remained the home of the IFR through 1973. In 1974, the IFR relocated to Tingley Coliseum in Albuquerque, New Mexico. In 1975, the event returned to Tulsa, where it remained through 1990. After the IFR celebrated its 20th anniversary, the association announced that they had signed a multi-year agreement with the Oklahoma City All Sports Association to hold the event in the city’s Myriad Convention Center beginning in January 1991. In 1997, the IFR moved to Oklahoma City’s State Fair Arena where it took place through 2002. The city’s recently opened Ford Center hosted the IFR in 2003. The event then returned to the State Fair Arena in 2004, where it remained through 2019. The IFR moved to the Lazy E Arena in Guthrie, Oklahoma in 2020 during its 50th year, where it remains today. 

In 1983, the organization was renamed the International Professional Rodeo Association (IPRA). 

In April 1993, the IPRA changed its Pauls Valley, Oklahoma headquarters to Oklahoma City, adjacent to the city’s historic stockyards.

In 2023, the IPRA was acquired by Rodeo Logistics.

Organization
The IPRA has been sanctioning rodeos for over 60 years in cities of all sizes. It sanctions almost 300 rodeos throughout the country, making it the second largest organization in the sport. The association is headquartered in Oklahoma City, Oklahoma. Montana Silversmiths partners with the IPRA and provides their belt buckles and is recognized as the "Official Silversmiths of the IPRA." The IPRA is registered on Bloomberg. The IPRA announced on August 28, 2019, that the IFR would now be held at the Lazy E Arena in Guthrie, Oklahoma. Additionally, the Miss Rodeo USA pageant is held at the IFR every year. The Miss Rodeo USA Association has represented the IFR for over five decades. Since 2016, the IFR has been streamed live on the Wrangler Network application.

IPRA events

 Bareback bronc riding
 Breakaway roping
 Steer wrestling
 Team roping
 Saddle bronc riding
 Tie-down roping
 Barrel racing
 Bull riding

See also
 Lists of rodeo performers
 Bull Riding Hall of Fame
 Professional Bull Riders
 Professional Rodeo Cowboys Association
 ProRodeo Hall of Fame
 American Bucking Bull
 Bull Riders Only
 Championship Bull Riding
 Professional Roughstock Series
 Women's Professional Rodeo Association
 Canadian Professional Rodeo Association

References

External links
Official Website

Rodeo organizations
Organizations based in Oklahoma City
Sports in Oklahoma City